Minor league baseball teams were based in Brenham, Texas in three seasons between 1905 and 1915. The Brenham teams played as members of the South Texas League in 1905 and Middle Texas League in 1914 and 1915.

History
Minor league baseball began in Brenham, Texas in 1905. The Brenham Cotton Pickers played briefly as members of the Class C level South Texas League. The Beaumont Oilers, with a 40–68 record, moved to Brenham on August 21, 1905. The team had a 1–6 record playing exclusively in Brenham, before becoming a road team. The Beaumont/Branham team completed the 1905 the season schedule playing their final home games in numerous locations including Austin, Texas and San Antonio, Texas and being called the "Orphans." The Beaumont/Brenham team finished with an overall record of 45–81, placing 8th and last in the South Texas League. The team was managed by Harry Longley and Brooks Gordon.

Minor league baseball returned in 1914 as the Brenham Brewers became charter members of the Class D level Middle Texas League. The Middle Texas League began play as a six–team league, with the franchises based in Bartlett, Texas (Bartlett Bearcats), Belton, Texas (Belton Braves), Georgetown, Texas (Georgetown Collegians), Lampasas, Texas (Lampasas Resorters) and Temple, Texas (Temple Tigers) joining Brenham in league play.

Art R. Bailey was the owner of the Brenham franchise in 1914 and Will Morriss served as secretary. Bailey owned a local cut glass company advertising as a jeweler and optician.

The Brenham use of the "Brewers" moniker corresponds to local industry in Brenham, with Brenham being been home to the G.F. Giesecke and Brothers Brewery of Brenham during the era.

The Brenham Brewers began play in the Middle Texas League on May 8, 1914, playing under manager Ike Pendleton. The Middle Texas League played a spit–season schedule, with champions during each half. Brenham placed 3rd overall in the league regular season standings, finishing 5.5 games behind the 1st place Temple Tigers. The final overall standings were led the Temple Tigers (54–27) followed by the Georgetown Collegians (50–30), Brenham Brewers (50–34), Belton Braves (37–47), Lampasas Resorters (35–51) and Bartlett Bearcats (22–59).

In 1915, Brenham hosted two Middle Texas League teams. Both teams folded, along with the Middle Texas League before the completion of the 1915 season. On June 7 1915, the Brenham Brewers folded. At the time they folded, the Brewers had a 12–31 record under managers Arthur Wicks and John Tuller. However, Brenham gained another team the next day. On May 1, 1915, the Austin Reps, with a 2–5 record, had moved to become the Taylor Producers due to flooding at the ballpark in Austin. On June 8, 1915, the day after the Brewers folded, team then moved from Taylor (15–23) to Brenham to replace the Brewers. Some references have the first 1915 Brenham team playing under the "Huskies" moniker instead of the "Brewers."

Beginning on June 9, 1915, the Brenham Kaisers continued play under managers Jack Snipes and Billy Disch until the Middle Texas League permanently folded on June 19, 1915. The Middle Texas league final standings were led by the Belton Braves (40–19), who finished 8.0 games ahead of the 2nd place Temple Governors (32–27), followed by the Bartlett Bearcats (29–26) and Austin Representatives/Taylor Producers/Brenham Kaisers (21–36). The Schulenburg Giants were 23–18 and the Brenham Brewers 12–31 when they both folded on June 7, 1915. The Belton Braves won both half–seasons of the league and no playoffs were held as the league folded.

Brenham, Texas has not hosted another minor league team.

The ballpark
A local newspaper in July 1914 referred to the Brenham home ballpark as League Park.

Timeline

Year–by–year record

Notable alumni
Billy Disch (1915, MGR)
Newt Hunter (1905)
Dutch Jordan (1915)

See also
Brenham Brewers players
Brenham Cotton Pickers players
Brenham Kaisers players

References

Brenham, Texas
Washington County, Texas